John McClannahan Crockett (December 26, 1816 – August 4, 1887) was a Texan lawyer, mayor of Dallas, and the eighth Lieutenant Governor of Texas. A South Carolina native, Crockett moved to Texas in 1847. He became the second mayor of Dallas, and the eighth Lieutenant Governor of Texas from 1861–1863.

Early life
Crockett was born at Lancaster, South Carolina, on December 26, 1816. He studied at Franklin Academy in Lancaster. Before studying law, he was involved in a business career. He married Catherine W. Polk on March 17, 1837. He started studying law in 1841, and in 1844, he was granted a license to practice law.

Life in Texas
Crockett and his wife, Catherine, moved to the city of Paris, Texas in 1847. In 1848 they moved to the Dallas area. William H. Hord, the brother-in-law of Crockett, was county judge there. Crockett started practicing law in the Dallas area, and also became deputy county clerk there. He became commissioner of the Mercer colony in 1850. In 1851 he became state representative from the Dallas area. He was involved in multiple court trials, and was a law partner of John Jay Good in the first half of the 1850s.

Dallas was granted a town charter on February 2, 1856 by the Texas legislature. Crockett was elected as the second mayor of Dallas in 1857, serving for three non-consecutive terms; his last was 1865-1866.

Crockett became meteorological observer for the Smithsonian Institution in Dallas in 1859. He was elected as the eighth Lieutenant Governor of Texas in 1861. He left the lieutenant governor's office in 1863. Despite a supportive constituency, he refused to enter the race for the governorship of Texas. He returned to the Dallas area to become superintendent of the Confederate arms factory in Lancaster, Texas.

After the war, he incorporated the Dallas Grain, Elevator, and Flouring Company in 1872. In 1875, he became a charter member of the executive committee of the Dallas Pioneers Association.

Death
Crockett died on August 4, 1887; he was interred at the Old Masonic Cemetery, Dallas.

References

1816 births
1887 deaths
Lieutenant Governors of Texas
Mayors of Dallas
People from Lancaster, South Carolina
Texas Democrats
19th-century American politicians
19th-century American lawyers